Campanario is a Spanish municipality in the province of Badajoz, Extremadura. It has a population of 5,470 (2007) and an area of 284 km².

References

External links
Official website 

 auto

Municipalities in the Province of Badajoz